The Arrinera Hussarya is a sports car project made by Polish automotive manufacturer Arrinera Automotive. It was touted by Arrinera as the first supercar designed and engineered in Poland. It was named after Poland's Hussar cavalry.

In 2021, it was announced that according to the latest quarterly report(dated 11.08.21), due to funding problems, the project will not be further developed.

Prototype 

The prototype of Arrinera premiered on 9 June 2011 to shareholders and investors. Some journalists gave the supercar the name "Venocara", although Arrinera Automotive has never officially used that name. It featured scissor doors for both the concept car and the production car.

In August 2012 Arrinera Automotive officially announced the name Hussarya for its new model. The name is derived from Poland's Hussar cavalry of the 16th century.

Specifications 
The Arrinera Hussarya 33 was to be tested with a mid-mounted General Motors-sourced supercharged 6.2-litre V8 producing . This engine based on GM's LS3 engine, and drives the rear wheels.

Special editions 

On 18 July 2012, it was announced that Arrinera would produce 33 units of a special "Series 33" version of the Hussarya, with exclusive designs on the exterior and the interior. Regular production of this and other Hussarya models appears not to have commenced.

Controversy 

In 2012 Polish radio and online journalist Jacek Balkan asserted that the vehicle was not an original supercar but a low-cost replica of a Lamborghini using parts from an Opel Corsa and an Audi A6. Arrinera sued Balkan for slander, but the journalist was acquitted.

Motorsport  
In 2017 the Hussarya was driven in qualifying for the Britcar series race at Donington Park by a half-Polish professional driver, Jonny MacGregor as an invitation entry. The car qualified fourth, but an engine blow-up meant it was unable to participate in the rest of the race weekend.

References

External links 

Official website

Rear mid-engine, rear-wheel-drive vehicles
Coupés
Grand tourers
Cars introduced in 2012
Cars introduced in 2016